Tuen Mun Swimming Pool is an MTR Light Rail stop located at ground level at the junction of  and Hoi Wing Road, next to KMB Tuen Mun South Depot and to the southeast of , an aquatics centre in Area 16 of Tuen Mun. 

It began service on 17 November 1991 and belongs to Zone 1. It serves Tuen Mun Swimming Pool and nearby areas. A railway station, currently named A16 station, has been proposed to be built as part of the Tuen Mun South extension of the Tuen Ma line.

MTR Light Rail stops
Former Kowloon–Canton Railway stations
Tuen Mun District
Railway stations in Hong Kong opened in 1991
1991 establishments in Hong Kong